The 2018–19 Southland Conference men's basketball season, the conference's 56th, began with practices in October 2018, followed by the start of the 2018–19 NCAA Division I men's basketball season on November 6, 2018. Conference play began on January 2, 2019 concluding on March 9, 2019. The Sam Houston State Bearkats won the regular season championship with a conference record of 16–2.  The 2019 Southland Conference men's basketball tournament was held in Katy, Texas at the Merrell Center from March 13–17, 2019.  The 2nd seeded Abilene Christian Wildcats won the conference tournament championship and received the conference automatic bid to the NCAA tournament.  Two other teams also received bids to post season tournaments.  Conference regular season champion, Sam Houston State, received the conference automatic bid to the NIT tournament. New Orleans received a bid to the CIT tournament.

Preseason

Coaching changes
McNeese State University announced that it would not renew the contract of former head coach Dave Simmons on March 4, 2018.  Heath Schroyer was named head coach on March 15, 2018.

Incarnate Word announced that Ken Burmeister would not return on March 6, 2018.  Carson Cunningham was named as men's basketball head coach on March 23, 2018.

2018-19 Southland Men's Basketball Preseason Poll

Preseason All-Conference Teams
Source:

Postseason

Southland Conference tournament

  March 13–16, 2019: Southland Conference Men's Basketball Tournament, Leonard E. Merrill Center, Katy, Texas

Source:

NCAA tournament

Abilene Christian, winner of the conference tournament, was awarded an automatic bid to the NCAA Division I basketball tournament.  Abilene Christian's season ended losing to Kentucky in the first round.

National Invitation tournament 

Sam Houston State received the conference automatic bid to the NIT tournament.  The Bearkats lost in the first round of the tournament to TCU.

CollegeInsider.com Postseason tournament 

New Orleans received a bid to the CIT.  The Privateers lost in an overtime game to Texas Southern in the first round.

Awards and honors

Regular season

SLC Player-of-the-Week

 Nov. 12 – Jaren Lewis (Abilene Christian)
 Nov. 19 – Morgan Taylor (Incarnate Word)
 Nov. 26 – Jaren Lewis (Abilene Christian)
 Dec. 3  – Kevon Harris (Stephen F. Austin)
 Dec. 10 – Shannon Bogues (Stephen F. Austin)
 Dec. 17 – Roydell Brown (McNeese State)
 Dec. 27 – Nick Garth (Lamar)
 Jan. 2  – Kevon Harris (Stephen F. Austin)
 Jan. 7 – Ian DuBose (Houston Baptist)
 Jan. 14 – Payten Ricks (Abilene Christian)
 Jan. 21 – Kai Mitchell (Sam Houston State)
 Jan. 28  – Cameron Delaney (Sam Houston State)
 Feb. 4  – Christian Barrett (Lamar)
 Feb. 11 – Ishmael Lane (Northwestern State)
 Feb. 18 – Nick Garth (Lamar)
 Feb. 25 – Josh Delaney (Sam Houston State)
 Mar. 4  – Nick Garth (Lamar)
 Mar. 10  – Jerimiah Jefferson (Nicholls)

Postseason

SLC All-Conference Teams and Awards 
Source:

References